Al Buteen is a locality in Dubai, United Arab Emirates (UAE). Al Buteen is located in eastern Dubai, in Deira and is bounded to its west by Al Ras, its east by Al Sabkha and its north by Al Dhagaya. Dubai Creek forms the southern periphery of the locality.  

Al Buteen is located between Old Baladiya Street (110th Road) and 21st Street. Due to its location in the central business district area of Deira, retail space in Al Buteen is expensive.

Notable people 

 Noor Al Suwaidi - artist and curator.

References 

Communities in Dubai